Avudaiyarkoil is a village in the Pudukkotai district of Tamil Nadu, India. The village has a temple named Tirupperunturai.  It is about  South East of the Major town Aranthangi along State Highway 26 (SH 26), on the South bank of the Vellar River.

Gallery

References

External links 

 Athmanadha Swamy Temple Gallery

Cities and towns in Pudukkottai district